Seo Min-Gook (born November 23, 1983) is a South Korean football player.

References

1983 births
Living people
South Korean footballers
Incheon United FC players
Gimcheon Sangmu FC players
K League 1 players
Korea National League players
Association football midfielders